Xhevdet is a predominantly Albanian language masculine given name. Notable people bearing the name Xhevdet include:

Xhevdet Bajraj (born 1960), Kosovan poet and screenwriter 
Xhevdet Doda (1906–1944), Kosovan World War II resistance member
Xhevdet Gela (born 1989), Kosovan-Finnish footballer
Xhevdet Llumnica (born 1979), Kosovan footballer
Xhevdet Muriqi (born 1963), Kosovan footballer
Xhevdet Picari, Albanian military soldier
Xhevdet Shabani (born 1986), Kosovan footballer 
Xhevdet Shaqiri (1923–1997), Albanian footballer 

Masculine given names
Albanian masculine given names